Allinge-Gudhjem is a former municipality in Denmark, on the island of Bornholm in the Baltic Sea.

The municipality covered an area of 154 km2, and had a total population of 7,658.

This former municipality is, since January 1, 2003, included in the municipality of Bornholm.

Former municipalities of Denmark
Bornholm